Coleophora hipponae is a moth of the family Coleophoridae. It is found in North Africa.

References

hipponae
Moths described in 1993
Moths of Africa